Terri Eden Maples Rachals is a former nurse from Georgia who was accused of killing people at Phoebe Putney Memorial Hospital in Albany, Georgia with potassium chloride, a heart-stopping drug. While suspected of killing at least nine of her patients, she was charged with only six murders, three of which she acknowledged possibly committing while in a "fugue state" in a recanted confession that she made to the Georgia Bureau of Investigation.

Her trial, held in 1986, found her guilty on one of twenty aggravated assault charges. The other nineteen charges, as well as the ones for murder, were dismissed after a psychiatrist testified that she suffered from depression and other disorders that made her unaware of what she was doing.

Rachals served 17 years in prison and was released in 2003.

References 

1966 births
American people convicted of assault
American prisoners and detainees
Living people
People acquitted of murder
Poisoners
Prisoners and detainees of Georgia (U.S. state)
Suspected serial killers